RV Le Suroît is a French research vessel operated by IFREMER. In 1985, it was involved in the successful Franco-American expedition to find the wreck of the RMS Titanic.

Since being refurbished in 1999, the vessel is able to undertake bathymetric and seismic research, as well as coring, dredging, and trawling tasks.

History 

The vessel was commissioned and built in 1975 by Ateliers et Chantiers de la Manche in Dieppe, Seine-Maritime.  In 1985, the ship was equipped with the new System Acoustique Remorqué (SAR) sonar device.  In early summer, the vessel undertook a 10-day sonar mission in an attempt to find the wreckage of RMS Titanic.  Aboard Le Suroît on this mission was Robert Ballard.  Le Suroît was able to rule out large sections of a pre-determined  search area – between 26 July and 6 August, 80% of the area had been searched. It later transpired that on one of its first passes, Le Suroît had come within only  of Titanic. The mission ended on 6 August, after which RV Knorr travelled from the Azores to concentrate on more specific areas using different strategies.

In October 2011, the vessel was on assignment in Crete before travelling to La Seyne-sur-Mer in December.

Facilities and equipment 
The vessel is equipped with a range of devices. The computers run IFREMER's CARAIBES mapping software. It has a safe working load (SWL) of 8 tons. The ship also has a  steel winch, with an SWL of 2.1 tons.

References 

1974 ships
Ships built in France
Research vessels of France